Jang Dae-Il (born 9 March 1975) is a former South Korean football player. His father is British.

He played for several clubs, including Seongnam Ilhwa Chunma and Busan I'cons.

He played for the South Korea national football team and was a participant at the 1998 FIFA World Cup.

Club career statistics

External links
 
 National Team Player Record 
 FIFA Player Statistics
 

1975 births
Living people
Association football defenders
South Korean footballers
South Korea international footballers
Seongnam FC players
Busan IPark players
K League 1 players
1998 FIFA World Cup players
Sportspeople from Incheon
Yonsei University alumni
South Korean people of British descent